Ferdinand Leopoldi, real name Ferdinand Israel Kohn (20 August 1886 – 20 December 1944) was an Austrian pianist, hit composer and cabaret manager.

Life 
Born in Vienna, Leopoldi was the eldest son of the musician Leopold Kohn (the official change of surname to Leopoldi took place in 1911). He taught him and his brother Hermann how to play the piano. He also tried to get engagements for the two; already at the age of six Ferdinand appeared as a pianist. In this time Leopoldis first hits came into being. In 1918 he was one of the co-founders of the International Artist Organization.

As solo pianist in Viennese cafés/bars he was advertised as Ferdinand Leopoldi, his brother Hermann as Leopoldi.

In 1922, together with the lecturer Fritz Wiesenthal (died 31 December 1936 in a sanatorium located in Mauer, Vienna at age 53/56), Hermann und Ferdinand Leopoldi opened the cabaret "Leopoldi-Wiesenthal", short "L.W.", in the Rothgasse 5 in the first district of Vienna. The restaurant soon became known far beyond the regional borders. In addition to Leopoldi-Wiesenthal, more or less regularly appeared Charlotte Waldow, Franzi Ressel, Hans Moser, Szöke Szakall, Max Hansen, Fritz Grünbaum, Karl Valentin or Raoul Aslan and Otto Tressler. In 1925, however, they had to close the restaurant for financial reasons, none of the managers had ever learnt how to do business. They then made guest appearances in Berlin and Switzerland and undertook tours.

Towards the end of the 1920s, the Leopoldi brothers gradually went their separate ways. Hermann had more and more solo appearances, Ferdinand took part in the 1926 movie Die Pratermizzi and was mainly active as bar pianist before he had numerous appearances with Robert Rakowianu (1886-1938) and Grete von Király on the radio in the 1930s.

After the Anschluss of Austria, his brother Hermann was deported to the Dachau Concentration Camp in 1938 and was able to emigrate to the US in 1939. Leopoldi, who was married to an Aryan, stayed in Vienna and lived secretly during the Austria under National Socialism period in an apartment in the Viennese . However, he was discovered there in 1943 and taken to an interrogation by the Gestapo, the consequences of which killed him in the Rothschild Hospital.

Works 
 Das Mädel ist nicht ohne. Lyrics by Wilhelm Sterk. Vienna 1920.
 Op. 33. Cyrano. Valse macabre. Klavier. Wiener Boheme-Verlag, Vienna 1920, OBV.
 Immer nur Du!. Slow-Fox. Music with Ferry Kowarik. Figaro-Verlag, Wien/Berlin 1927, OBV.
 Rax-Marsch. Music with Robert Rakowianu.
 Ronald Leopoldi (editor): Leopoldiana. Gesammelte Werke von Hermann Leopoldi und elf Lieder von Ferdinand Leopoldi. Doblinger, Vienna 2011, .

Filmography 
 1927: Die Pratermizzi

Bibliography 
 Felix Czeike (editor): Historisches Lexikon Wien. Volume 4, Kremayr & Scheriau, Vienna 1995, 
 Monika Kornberger: Leopoldi (actually Kohn), Familie. In Oesterreichisches Musiklexikon. Inline edition, Vienna 2002. ; Druckausgabe: volume 3, Austrian Academy of Sciences edition, Vienna 2004, .
 Josef Koller: Das Wiener Volkssängertum in alter und neuer Zeit. Nacherzähltes und Selbsterlebtes. Gerlach & Wiedling, Vienna 1931, .
 Peter Herz: Gestern war ein schöner Tag. Liebeserklärung eines Librettisten an die Vergangenheit. Österreichischer Bundesverlag, Wien 1985, .
 Hans Weiss, Ronald Leopoldi (editors): Hermann Leopoldi und Helly Möslein. "In einem kleinen Café in Hernals …". Eine Bildbiographie (Edition Trend S) Orac, Vienna  1992, .

References

External links 
 
 Entry in the Central Database of Holocaust Victims' Names of the Yad Vashem Memorial
 Tondokument bei hermannleopoldi.at Hermann and Ferdinand Leopoldi play the marionette foxtrot by E. Gareri, auf Favorite 1-166 (mx. F 104), recorded in Vienna 1923/24.

1886 births
1944 deaths
Musicians from Vienna
Austrian male silent film actors
20th-century Austrian male actors
Austrian composers
Austrian pianists
Austrian Jews who died in the Holocaust